Wœrth or Woerth is a commune in the Bas-Rhin department and Grand Est region of north-eastern France.

Wœrth Castle has housed the mairie since 1977.

Population

Notable people
 Wynkyn de Worde (??-1534)
 Eugène Wintzweiller (1844–1870)

Gallery

See also
 Communes of the Bas-Rhin department

References

Communes of Bas-Rhin
Bas-Rhin communes articles needing translation from French Wikipedia